Barbara Vorse Fealy (1903 – December 30, 2000) was an American landscape architect. In 1985, Fealy was elected a fellow of the American Society of Landscape Architects, making her the first woman member in Oregon. 

Her works, which centered in Portland, Oregon, and the broader Pacific Northwest, have been recognized in several ways, including several which have been listed on the National Register of Historic Places. Fealy worked on landscape design for Timberline Lodge, which was later named a National Historic Landmark.

Biography 
Fealy was born in Salt Lake City, Utah, in 1903 to Albert Justin Vorse, the operator of a large plant nursery, and Bettie Vorse. As a child Healy worked with her father in the nursery. She studied landscape architecture the University of Illinois from 1921 to 1925.  She was taught by scholars including Jens Jensen and Stanley Hart White.

After graduating in 1925, she took a job with her father. In either 1926 or 1928 Fealy moved to Denver, where she worked for McCrary, Culley and Carhart. She formed her own architectural firm in 1929, returning to Salt Lake City. In 1932, she was hired by the Utah State Planning Commission. 

Fealy moved to Oregon in 1947 with her husband, where she worked on a number of landscape designs, including those at the Oregon College of Art and Craft and the Leach Botanical Garden. In 1985, Fealy was elected a fellow of the American Society of Landscape Architects, making her the first woman member in Oregon. She died in 2000.

Personal life 
In 1932, Fealy married Morris Hoag. She had at least two daughters.

Notable works 
Barbara Feely was involved in landscape design for a number of locations, including:

References 

1903 births
2000 deaths
American landscape architects
People from Salt Lake City
University of Illinois alumni
Women landscape architects